USS Mount Washington may refer to:

, was the side‑wheel gunboat Mount Vernon acquired by the US Navy in April 1861 and sold June 1865
, was a transport oiler

United States Navy ship names